Cambyses, King of Persia is 1671 tragedy by the English writer Elkanah Settle. It was staged by the Duke's Company at the Lincoln's Inn Fields Theatre in London. The original cast included Thomas Betterton as Cambyses, Henry Harris as Prexaspes, John Crosby as  Otanes, William Smith as Darius, Henry Norris as  Artaban, Matthew Medbourne as Smerdis, Samuel Sandford as Parasithes, John Young as Theramnes, Mary Betterton as Mandana, Elinor Dixon as Orinda and Jane Long as Osiris.

References

Bibliography
 Van Lennep, W. The London Stage, 1660-1800: Volume One, 1660-1700. Southern Illinois University Press, 1960.

1671 plays
West End plays
Tragedy plays
Plays by Elkanah Settle